KJEM (89.9 FM) is a radio station licensed to Pullman, Washington. The station is owned by Washington State University, and airs Northwest Public Broadcasting's first 24-hour Jazz service. While supervised by Northwest Public Broadcasting staff, the station will be run primarily by students.

Call letters
The station call letters acknowledge J. Elroy McCaw, a WSU broadcasting alumnus. McCaw's son Bruce made a donation to Washington State University to fund the new station. J. Elroy McCaw is the father of Craig McCaw, founder of McCaw Cellular (a forerunner of AT&T Mobility).

References

External links

JEM
JEM
Radio stations established in 2013
2013 establishments in Washington (state)
Jazz radio stations in the United States